The Kars Museum was opened in 1963 in the Cathedral of Kars (now the Kümbet Mosque) of Kars, Turkey.

The structure was first built as an Armenian church (The Holy Apostles Church) under the Armenian Bagratuni Dynasty by Abbas in 930–937. In 1579, it was converted to a mosque. Archaeological works from Kars and its surrounding region, as well as objects uncovered by the excavations of the medieval Armenian city of Ani were gathered here. After the new museum building was completed the works were moved and exhibited there.

The new museum in Kars can be found in a road which forks off the road to Ani in the northeast of the town. Finds from the Bronze Age to the present day are on display. An annex also houses an ethnography department.

See also 
 Cathedral of Kars

External links 
 Kars Museum and its history from the Republic of Turkey Ministry of Culture and Tourism
 Location on Wikimapia

Museums established in 1963
Ethnographic museums in Turkey
Archaeological museums in Turkey
Museums in Kars Province